HVM Racing was an auto racing team owned by Keith Wiggins that competed in the IndyCar Series. It competed in the Champ Car World Series in 2007 as Minardi Team USA when it was co-owned by Paul Stoddart. It has a long history of changes of ownership, including a previous incarnation as CTE-HVM Racing, co-owned by actor/comedian Cedric the Entertainer.

Its 2007 driver lineup was Dan Clarke and former Formula One driver Robert Doornbos, who previously raced for Minardi F1.

In the first race of the season, the 2007 Las Vegas Grand Prix, Robert Doornbos made the most successful debut since Nigel Mansell in 1993, finishing second on the podium.

They also made the distinction of being the only team willing to run a car numbered 13 full-time, with driver E. J. Viso, when they did so for the 2009 IndyCar Series season, despite negative superstitions from the past about running it in any form of motorsport.

History

Bettenhausen Motorsports
The team has had a long history of names, first as Bettenhausen Motorsports under the leadership of Tony Bettenhausen Jr.  The cars were primarily dark blue, white and red with Alumax Aluminum sponsorship and ran several drivers of note, Stefan Johansson, Hélio Castroneves, and Patrick Carpentier among them. The 1992 car appeared in the cover of the 1993 video game IndyCar Racing. They had a difficult 1999 season as Shigeaki Hattori had his competitor's license revoked by chief steward Wally Dallenbach Sr. before the race at Laguna Seca.

Beginning of the Keith Wiggins era

Before the 2000 season started, Bettenhausen, his wife and two business associates were killed in a plane crash on their way home from vacation in Florida.  The team was renamed Herdez Competition as Michel Jourdain Jr. came aboard with Wiggins taking over as co-owner and managing director.  Two uncompetitive seasons followed and Mario Dominguez was brought into the team in 2002.  A fortunate victory came at Surfers Paradise in a water-logged event, as Dominguez started last and failed to pass a single car on track but benefited from pit strategy.

The win boosted his confidence and the team recorded a 1-2 result at Miami, Dominguez leading Roberto Moreno, was the highlight of a much-improved 2003 season, finishing fifth in the championship. Ryan Hunter-Reay came into the team in 2004 and led all 250 laps at The Milwaukee Mile from the pole position. Herdez sponsorship faded at the end of the year and for 2005, with the team now called HVM, Wiggins was forced to take on pay-drivers Björn Wirdheim and Ronnie Bremer. Despite Wirdheim's impressive performances in the 2003 International Formula 3000 season, his subsequent championship title, and Jaguar F1 testing experience, he failed to regularly beat Bremer during the season. Both of their funds dried up, however, before the end of the season and several other drivers had chances in the team's two cars.

Cedric the Entertainer became a co-owner late in the season and added a celebrity presence to the field. The cars that year ran a distinctive gunmetal gray livery with Cedric's A Bird and A Bear entertainment company on the sidepods. Nelson Philippe won in Australia and the team recorded their best season with a fourth place in the championship by Philippe.

Minardi Team USA
In 2006, Paul Stoddart, former owner of the Minardi Formula One team, bought an interest in the team and renamed it Minardi Team USA.  For the 2007 season, Stoddart and Wiggins lined up the services of Dan Clarke and Red Bull F1 Racing test driver Robert Doornbos.  With Doornbos the team began competing for podium positions regularly.  The team scored its first win under the Minardi Team USA banner at the 2007 Champ Car Grand Prix de Mont Tremblant. Doornbos went on to capture another win at San Jose, and his tally for 2007 was 2 wins and 6 podiums. Doornbos went on to finish 3rd in Championship standings, earn Rookie of the Year, and was the highest finishing Rookie in the Champ Car World Series since Juan Pablo Montoya in 1999. Doornbos also won the award for Hard Charger, improving the most positions during the race.

Dan Clarke had a season plagued with bad luck, but had a bright spot when he finished 2nd at Road America, though he was involved in a high-speed incident with Doornbos, which hurt the Dutchman's championship hopes. Clarke later triggered a multi-car pile-up during free practice at Zolder, and was suspended from competition for the race weekend.

HVM in IndyCar

In 2008, following American open wheel unification, the team moved to the IRL IndyCar Series with E. J. Viso as its driver. The team also participated in the Long Beach Grand Prix with two more cars under the Minardi Team USA name for Nelson Philippe and Roberto Moreno.  Viso finished the 2008 season with seven top-10 finishes and a season-best fourth-place finish at St. Petersburg.

Viso stayed in the team in 2009 and the team aligned itself with the Indy Lights team Michael Crawford Motorsports, renaming it HVM Indy Lights. The Indy Lights team ran its first race at Infineon Raceway in August 2009 with driver Juan Pablo Garcia.  Ryan Hunter-Reay tested the team's IndyCar at Sebring two weeks before the 2009 season opener at St. Petersburg and appeared to become the second driver for the team, but signed with Vision Racing instead.  Nelson Philippe joined the team as its second driver for the Indianapolis 500. Robert Doornbos returned to HVM in August 2009, piloting the #33 for the remainder of the 2009 season.

For the 2010 season, HVM Racing signed Switzerland's Simona de Silvestro full-time to drive the #78 Team Stargate Worlds entry. de Silvestro was one of five women to compete in the IndyCar Series in 2010, along with Ana Beatriz, Milka Duno, Sarah Fisher, and Danica Patrick, and finished 19th in the overall points standings. She was the second highest-placed female in the points standings, behind Danica Patrick, who finished tenth. de Silvestro's best finish in 2010 came at Mid–Ohio Sports Car Course, where she finished in eighth place.

On October 6, 2010, just four days after the 2010 season concluded, HVM Racing announced that they would be bringing de Silvestro back to the team in 2011 in the #78 entry.

On October 30, 2012, de Silvestro signed on to KV Racing Technology for 2013, leaving HVM without a driver or a sponsor. However, former KV driver E. J. Viso had intended to run his own team for 2013, but had little luck. HVM and Viso joined forces with Andretti Autosport to run Viso as a satellite team for Andretti. On 11 November 2015 the team was listed as up for auction officially listing the team as defunct.

List of Drivers for Bettenhausen/Herdez/HVM/CTE-HVM/Minardi Team USA
 Gary Bettenhausen (1982–1983, 1996)
 Ronnie Bremer (2005)
 Patrick Carpentier (1997)
 Hélio Castroneves (1998)
 Dan Clarke (2006–2007)
 Simona de Silvestro (2010–2012)
 Fabrizio del Monte (2005)
 Mario Dominguez (2002–2004, 2007)
 Robert Doornbos (2007, 2009)
 Roberto González (2003)
 Shigeaki Hattori (1999)
 Ryan Hunter-Reay (2004)
 Stefan Johansson (1992–1996)
 Michel Jourdain Jr. (2000–2001)
 Rodolfo Lavin (2005)
 Roberto Moreno (2003, 2008)
 Nelson Philippe (2006, 2008, 2009)
 Homero Richards (2005)
 Gualter Salles (1999)
 Alex Sperafico (2005)
 E. J. Viso (2008–2009)
 Björn Wirdheim (2005)

Results

CART/CCWS

IRL IndyCar Series

Complete CART / Champ Car World Series results
(key) (results in bold indicate pole position) (results in italics indicate fastest lap)

Complete IndyCar Series results
(key)

 Run to Champ Car specifications.
 Non-points-paying, exhibition race.
 The final race at Las Vegas was canceled due to Dan Wheldon's death.

References

External links
 

American auto racing teams
Champ Car teams
IndyCar Series teams
Indy Lights teams 
European Le Mans Series teams
24 Hours of Le Mans teams